Kalch'ŏn station is a railway station in Kalch'ŏl-li, Hanggu-guyŏk, Namp'o Special City, North Korea, on the P'yŏngnam Line of the Korean State Railway.

The station was opened by the Chosen Government Railway on 1 May 1924.

References

Railway stations in North Korea
Railway stations opened in 1924